Say Hey may refer to:

Sports

 Willie Mays (1931- ), American baseball player, nicknamed “the Say Hey Kid”

Music
 Say Hey Records, music label
 "Say Hey", a single from Ira Losco discography
 "Say Hey", a song by the Tubes from Love Bomb (The Tubes album)
 "Say Hey", a song by Kylie Minogue from Impossible Princess  1997
 "Say Hey (I Love You)", a 2008 song by Michael Franti & Spearhead featuring Jamaica Cherine Anderson